Edward Campion Acheson (April 7, 1858 – January 28, 1934) was sixth bishop of the Episcopal Diocese of Connecticut, serving as suffragan from 1915 to 1926; and coadjutor from 1926 to 1928. He was diocesan bishop from 1928 to 1934.

Early life and education
Acheson was born on April 7, 1858, in Woolwich, Kent in England, the son of Alexander Acheson and Mary Campion. He moved to Canada in 1881 settling in Toronto where he served with The Queen's Own Rifles of Canada and served in the North-West Rebellion in 1885. He studied for the priesthood at Wycliffe College and graduated in 1889, after which he moved to the United States. He also received a Master of Arts from New York University in 1892 and earned a Doctor of Sacred Theology from Trinity College in 1916. He was also granted a Doctor of Divinity from Wesleyan University and Berkeley Divinity School in 1916 and from Wycliffe College in 1917, respectively.

Ordination
Acheson was ordained deacon on June 10, 1888, and priest on July 14, 1889, in the Anglican Church of Canada. He served his diaconate as curate at All Saints Church in Toronto. After ordination to the priesthood and after settling in the United States, he became assistant minister at St. George's Church in New York City. In 1892 he became rector of Holy Trinity Church in Middletown, Connecticut.

Bishop
In 1915, Acheson was elected Suffragan Bishop of Connecticut. He was consecrated on November 4, 1915, by the Bishop of Connecticut Chauncey B. Brewster in the Church of the Holy Trinity in Middletown, Connecticut. In 1926, he was elected Coadjutor Bishop of Connecticut and succeeded as diocesan bishop on November 16, 1928.

Family
Acheson married Eleanor G. Gooderham, granddaughter of William Gooderham Sr., on June 8, 1892, in Toronto, and together had three children. Their son was the American lawyer and politician Dean Acheson.

See also 
List of bishops of the Episcopal Church in the United States of America

References

External links 
Portrait
Comforting Coadjutor

1858 births
1934 deaths
Canadian emigrants to the United States
British emigrants to Canada
Episcopal Church in Connecticut
University of Toronto people
Episcopal bishops of Connecticut